Lamb Chop is a sock puppet anthropomorphic sheep created by the late puppeteer and ventriloquist Shari Lewis. The character, a female lamb, first appeared during Lewis' guest appearance on Captain Kangaroo in March 1956 and later appeared on Hi Mom (1957–1959), a local morning show that aired on WRCA-TV in New York, New York.

Concept and creation
Lamb Chop has been described as a "6-year-old girl, very intuitive and very feisty, a combination of obstinacy and vulnerability...you know how they say fools rush in where wise men fear to go? Well, Lamb Chop would rush in, then scream for help." Lamb Chop, in all her shows, had referred to her close friend, a girl named Lolly Pincus.

From 1960 to 1963, Lewis had her own musical-comedy network television show called The Shari Lewis Show. As children's programming turned more towards animation in the mid-1960s, she continued to perform in a wide range of venues. In 1992, Lamb Chop and Lewis began their own PBS children's show, Lamb Chop's Play-Along, an Emmy Award winner for five consecutive years. The show lasted approximately 25 minutes per episode. On PBS, it premiered September 10, 1992 and was last shown on January 1, 1997. From 2007 to 2009, it was shown on Qubo. Lamb Chop then went on to co-star with Lewis on the short-lived spin-off The Charlie Horse Music Pizza. The show was canceled after Lewis' death. The last episode of The Charlie Horse Music Pizza aired on January 17, 1999.

In 1993, when Lewis appeared before the U.S. Congress in an oversight hearing on the Children's Television Act, Lamb Chop provided her own testimony.

Two years later after Lewis died in 1998, her daughter, producer and writer Mallory Lewis, began to perform with Lamb Chop. Mallory Lewis had worked closely with her mother when producing Lamb Chop's Play-Along and The Charlie Horse Music Pizza. About her mother and Lamb Chop she said:

Shari Lewis' other puppet, Hush Puppy, made his comeback at the Iowa State Fair in 2010. Mallory Lewis doesn't perform Charlie Horse, as doing his voice is hard on her vocal cords. Prior to her death, Shari Lewis sold the rights of Lamb Chop to Classic Media (now DreamWorks Classics, part of NBCUniversal), though her daughter still owns the live performing rights.

Mallory Lewis and Lamb Chop currently perform mainly for the US military. Lamb Chop is an honorary three-star general in the Marines.

In the first year's collection of 9 Chickweed Lane dailies, Out Whom Shall We Gross?, the August 31, 1993 strip quotes Lambchop as saying, "A virtuous man's honesty exists only in proportion to the pyre upon which he atones for it."

Mallory Lewis described Lamb Chop's values as a "liberal Jewish Democrat".

References

External links

 Mallory Lewis and Lamb Chop

Puppets
Fictional sheep
Fictional Democrats (United States)
Fictional American Jews
Ventriloquists' dummies
Television characters introduced in 1957